Unleashed is an album by the Nashville Bluegrass Band, released through Sugar Hill Records in October 1995. In 1996, the album won the group the Grammy Award for Best Bluegrass Album.

Track listing
 "Tear My Stillhouse Down" (Welch) – 2:27
 "Dark Shadows of Night" (Wigley, Wilbur) – 3:09
 "Boll Weevil" (traditional) – 2:10
 "Last Time on the Road" (Jones) – 2:46
 "I Got a Date" (Allen, Bays) – 2:40
 "Blackbirds and Crows" (Humphries) – 2:47
 "One More Dollar" (Rawlings, Welch) – 2:58
 "Doorstep of Trouble" (Hadley) – 2:11
 "You Wouldn't Know Love" (Dowling, Handley) – 3:30
 "Dog Remembers Bacon" (Duncan, OBryant) – 2:19
 "Little White Washed Chimney" (Clifton) – 2:22
 "Almost" (Allen, Stinson) – 2:12
 "Last Month of the Year" (Fairfield Four) – 3:01

Personnel

 Jerry Douglas – producer
 Stuart Duncan – fiddle, vocal harmony
 Pat Enright – guitar, vocals, vocal harmony
 Brad Hartman – engineer
 Bradley Hartman – engineer

 Gene Libbea – bass, vocal harmony
 Nashville Bluegrass Band – arranger
 Alan O'Bryant – banjo, vocals, vocal harmony
 Roland White – mandolin, vocals, vocal harmony

References

External links
 Nashville Bluegrass Band's official site

1995 albums
Nashville Bluegrass Band albums
Sugar Hill Records albums
Grammy Award for Best Bluegrass Album